Sovetskaya Lake is a liquid subglacial lake found buried under the Antarctic ice sheet,  below Sovetskaya Research Station.

See also
 Lake Vostok (the largest subglacial lake in Antarctica)
 90 Degrees East
 Sovetskaya (Antarctic Research Station)

References

Subglacial lakes
Lakes of Kaiser Wilhelm II Land